"Paper Planes" is the debut single by season six runner-up of The Voice Australia, Hoseah Partsch. It is co-written by Dennis Dowlut (ex-Disco Montego) and Maxwell Bidstrup, which was released digitally immediately after the final on 2 July 2017. The song debuted and peaked at number 35 on the ARIA Singles Chart with 5,147 sales.

Speaking about the single, Partsch said: "I fell in love with it straightaway... It feels like something that I would have written myself. It talks about my life and things that I'm going through today. I've been blessed, and I feel like I'm flying. I'm extremely excited about everything that’s coming up. I can't wait."

A lyric music video was released on YouTube on 7 December 2017.

On the 8 February 2018, Partsch performed the song live on BBC Radio 2 breakfast show.

Versions 
 Original – 3:44 
 MOZA remix – 3:18 
 Hounded remix – 3:14 
 Haides remix – 4:21 
 Cuurely remix – 3:43

Charts

Release history

References 
 

2017 songs
2017 debut singles
Universal Records singles